The Wenchang Natural Gas Power Station, also known as Wenchang Gas-Fired Power Plant, is a natural gas peaking power plant in Hainan Province, located in Wenchang, adjacent to the Wenchang Spacecraft Launch Site. It is the first large-scale natural gas peaker plant on the Hainan Island, with a total investment of 2.4 billion yuan.

History
On March 12, 2020, the first unit of Wenchang Natural Gas Power Station completed a 168-hour trial operation and was officially put into operation.

On June 24, the generating station was fully put into operation for power generation. It is one of the key projects in the energy and power plan of Hainan Province during the 13th Five-Year Plan period.

Wenchang Natural Gas Power Station is designed to produce 2.276 billion kWh of electricity annually.

References 

2020 establishments in China
Energy infrastructure completed in 2020
Natural gas-fired power stations in China